Karoon Hosakul (born December 4, 1967 in Yasothon Province) is a Thai politician. He was a prominent politician in Don Mueang, Bangkok. He served as Member of Parliament for the Bangkok 12th district.  On 9 May 2013, he was disqualified and banned from politics for five years for defaming rival candidate and party. A by-election was held to replace him.

References

1967 births
Living people
Karun Hosakul
Karun Hosakul
Karun Hosakul
Karun Hosakul
Karun Hosakul
Karun Hosakul
Karun Hosakul